3rd SFFCC Awards
December 13, 2004

Best Picture: 
 Sideways 
The 3rd San Francisco Film Critics Circle Awards, honoring the best in film for 2004, were given on December 13, 2004.

Winners

Best Picture:
Sideways
Best Director: 
Alexander Payne - Sideways
Best Screenplay: 
Sideways - Alexander Payne and Jim Taylor
Best Actor: 
Paul Giamatti - Sideways
Best Actress:
Julie Delpy - Before Sunset
Best Supporting Actor: 
Thomas Haden Church - Sideways
Best Supporting Actress: 
Virginia Madsen - Sideways
Best Foreign Language Film: 
Maria Full of Grace • Colombia/United States/Ecuador
Best Documentary:
Fahrenheit 9/11
Marlon Riggs Award (for courage & vision in the Bay Area film community): 
Anita Monga, former programmer for the Castro Theatre

External links
2004 San Francisco Film Critics Circle Awards

References
'Sideways' takes top honors / S.F. critics give comedy six awards

San Francisco Film Critics Circle Awards
2004 film awards
2004 in San Francisco